Salman Akbar (born 3 January 1982, in Lahore) is a Pakistani field hockey player and coach. He is a former captain and goalkeeper of the Pakistan Men's Hockey Team. A veteran of 230 games, he has represented Pakistan in the 2004 and 2008 Olympics. He lives in Holland now.

In 2018, he was appointed Japan's Men's Team's Goalkeeping Coach.

Career
In 2001, Akbar was the captain of Pakistan Junior Hockey Team; he represented Pakistan national senior team in champions trophy in Rotterdam, Holland.

In 2002, he represented Pakistan in the world cup in Kuala Lumpur, Malaysia.

In 2003, he represented Pakistan in champions trophy Amstelveen, Holland.

In 2004, he represented Pakistan in Athens, Greece Olympics and also champions trophy Lahore, Pakistan.

In 2005, he won the Robo Cup beating Australia in final Amstelveen, Holland.

In 2006, he won a silver medal in Commonwealth Games Melbourne, Australia, bronze in Asian Games Doha, Qatar and played world cup Mönchengladbach, Germany.

In 2007, he was the captain of Pakistan Hockey Team in champions Trophy Kuala Lumpur, Malaysia.

In 2008, he represented Pakistan in Beijing, China Olympics.

In November 2010, Akbar was a part of the gold medal winning team at the Asian Games in Guangzhou, China. At the 2010 Asian Games he was rewarded as the best goalkeeper in the tournament in Beijing, China and played world cup in Delhi, India.

As of 2019, Salman Akbar plays for Victoria and also gives training to the Victoria and HC Pijnacker keepers.

See also
Pakistan national field hockey team

References

External links
 

1982 births
Living people
Pakistani male field hockey players
Male field hockey goalkeepers
2002 Men's Hockey World Cup players
2006 Men's Hockey World Cup players
2010 Men's Hockey World Cup players
Field hockey players at the 2010 Commonwealth Games
Asian Games medalists in field hockey
Field hockey players at the 2006 Asian Games
Field hockey players at the 2010 Asian Games
Asian Games gold medalists for Pakistan
Asian Games bronze medalists for Pakistan
Medalists at the 2006 Asian Games
Medalists at the 2010 Asian Games
Olympic field hockey players of Pakistan
Field hockey players at the 2004 Summer Olympics
Field hockey players at the 2008 Summer Olympics
Field hockey players from Lahore
Commonwealth Games medallists in field hockey
Commonwealth Games silver medallists for Pakistan
Medallists at the 2006 Commonwealth Games